Sceletolepisma is a genus of primitive insects (order Zygentoma = Thysanura s.s.) closely related to the silverfish and firebrat but less reliant on human habitation, some species being found both indoors and outdoors and some found exclusively outdoors. The genus is distributed nearly worldwide in warm regions.

Nomenclature
Many members of the genus Sceletolepisma have been previously included in other genera, such as Ctenolepisma. Most authors have historically treated the nomenclatural gender of Sceletolepisma as feminine, but in 2018 the International Commission on Zoological Nomenclature issued a formal ruling (ICZN Opinion 2427) stating the gender of Lepisma (and all genera with that ending) is neuter, following ICZN Article 30, which resulted in changes to the spelling of several species.

Diversity
There are roughly 40 extant species presently recognized as valid in the genus:

Sceletolepisma activum (Silvestri, 1922)
Sceletolepisma albidum (Escherich, 1905)
Sceletolepisma arenicola (Wygodzinsky, 1955)
Sceletolepisma boschimanum Irish, 1996
Sceletolepisma canariense Mendes, Molero-Baltanas, Bach de Roca & Gaju-Ricart, 1993
Sceletolepisma capense Irish, 1987
Sceletolepisma corvinum (Silvestri, 1908)
Sceletolepisma desperatum Irish, 1987
Sceletolepisma detritus Irish, 1987
Sceletolepisma grandipalpe (Escherich, 1905)
Sceletolepisma huabense Irish, 1988
Sceletolepisma inornatum Irish, 1987
Sceletolepisma intercursum (Silvestri, 1922)
Sceletolepisma kaokoense Irish, 1987
Sceletolepisma karooense Irish, 1996
Sceletolepisma latera Irish, 1987
Sceletolepisma lociplana Irish, 1996
Sceletolepisma luederitzi Irish, 1987
Sceletolepisma messor Irish, 1996
Sceletolepisma michaelseni (Escherich, 1905)
Sceletolepisma namaquense Irish, 1987
Sceletolepisma namibense Irish, 1987
Sceletolepisma occidentale Irish, 1987
Sceletolepisma orangicum Irish, 1994
Sceletolepisma ossilitorale Irish, 1987
Sceletolepisma ovsense Irish, 1994
Sceletolepisma parcespinatum (Silvestri, 1908)
Sceletolepisma pauliani Wygodzinsky 1959
Sceletolepisma penrithae Irish, 1987
Sceletolepisma placidum Irish, 1987
Sceletolepisma plusiochaeta (Silvestri, 1922)
Sceletolepisma prompta Silvestri, 1922
Sceletolepisma rodriguezi Mendes, Molero-Baltanas, Bach de Roca & Gaju-Ricart, 1993
Sceletolepisma sanctithomae Mendes, 1993
Sceletolepisma saxeta Irish, 1987
Sceletolepisma silvestrii Stach, 1946
Sceletolepisma spinipes Irish, 1987
Sceletolepisma subterebrans Irish, 1987
Sceletolepisma suliptera Irish, 1994
Sceletolepisma ugabense Irish, 1987

Notes

References

Lepismatidae
Insect genera